Cecil Milner Eastwood (7 May 1894 – 1968) was an English footballer who played in the Football League for Plymouth Argyle, Preston North End and Stoke City.

Career
Eastwood was born in Castleford and began his career with Plymouth Argyle in 1920. He played four seasons under the management of Bob Jack as Plymouth tried in vain to gain promotion to the Second Division, finishing 2nd three seasons running. He signed for Preston North End where he spent the 1925–26 season before joining Stoke City. He helped the "Potters" to win the Third Division North at the first time of asking in 1926–27 but unfortunately for Eastwood he was not considered good enough for 2nd tier football and left in January 1928. He then had an unsuccessful spell at Stockport County.

Career statistics
Source:

Honours
Stoke City
Football League Third Division North Champions: 1926–27

References

1894 births
1968 deaths
Sportspeople from Castleford
English footballers
Association football wing halves
Castleford Town F.C. players
Plymouth Argyle F.C. players
Preston North End F.C. players
Stoke City F.C. players
Stockport County F.C. players
English Football League players